Ove ruke nisu male... 1 (These hands are not small... 1) is the first compilation album by the Serbian alternative rock band Disciplina Kičme, released by Tom Tom Music in 2000. The compilation features the material released on the first studio album, Sviđa mi se da ti ne bude prijatno, and the first EP, Ja imam šarene oči, as well as live material, recorded at the Zagreb Lapidarij in 1982. The second part of the compilation, Ove ruke nisu male... 2 was released in 2005, by the same record label.

Track listing

Sviđa mi se da ti ne bude prijatno

Ja imam šarene oči

Uživo (Lapidarij, Zg, 1982.)

References
 EX YU ROCK enciklopedija 1960-2006, Janjatović Petar; 
 Ove ruke nisu male... 1 at Discogs

2000 compilation albums
Serbian-language albums
Disciplina Kičme albums
Albums recorded in Slovenia